Newton Arlosh is a village in the civil parish of Holme East Waver in Cumbria, United Kingdom.

Landmarks
St. John the Evangelist's Church is one of the most complete fortified churches in the area.  In ruins from the Dissolution until the 19th century, it was repaired and extended in 1844 by Sara Losh.  It has been designated by English Heritage as a Grade I listed building.

Nearby settlements
Nearby settlements include the city of Carlisle, the villages of Kirkbride and Abbeytown and the hamlet of Raby.

Other features
It is on the B5307 road and is near the channel of the River Waver. There is also Kirkbride Airfield nearby.

See also

Listed buildings in Holme East Waver

References

External links

 Cumbria County History Trust: Holme East Waver (nb: provisional research only – see Talk page)
 http://www.visitcumbria.com/car/newtonarlosh.htm

Villages in Cumbria
Allerdale